"Patrolling Barnegat" is a poem by Walt Whitman, first published in Leaves of Grass.

References

Poetry by Walt Whitman
1856 poems